David Ignatow (February 7, 1914 – November 17, 1997) was an American poet and editor.

Life
David Ignatow was born in Brooklyn, New York on February 7, 1914, and spent most of his life in the New York City area. He died on November 17, 1997, aged 83, at his home in East Hampton, New York. His papers are held at University of California, San Diego.

Ignatow began his professional career as a businessman. After committing wholly to poetry, Ignatow worked as an editor of, among other periodicals, the American Poetry Review and the Beloit Poetry Journal, and as poetry editor of The Nation.

He taught at the New School for Social Research, the University of Kentucky, the University of Kansas, Vassar College, York College (CUNY), New York University, and Columbia University.  He was president of the Poetry Society of America from 1980 to 1984 and poet-in-residence at the Walt Whitman Birthplace Association in 1987.

Awards
Ignatow's many honors include a Bollingen Prize, two Guggenheim fellowships, the John Steinbeck Award, and a National Institute of Arts and Letters award "for a lifetime of creative effort." He received the Shelley Memorial Award (1966), the Frost Medal (1992), and the William Carlos Williams Award (1997) of the Poetry Society of America.

Bibliography

Living Is What I Wanted: Last Poems (BOA Editions, 1999)
At My Ease: Uncollected Poems of the Fifties and Sixties (1998)
I Have a Name (1996)
The End Game and Other Stories (1996)
Against the Evidence: Selected Poems, 1934-1994 (1994)
Despite the Plainness of the Day: Love Poems (1991)
Shadowing the Ground (1991)
New and Collected Poems, 1970-1985 (1986)
Leaving the Door Open (1984)
Whisper to the Earth (1981)
Conversations (1980)
Sunlight (1979)
Tread the Dark (1978)
Selected Poems (1975)
Facing the Tree (1975)
Poems: 1934-1969 (1970)
Rescue the Dead (1968)
Earth Hard: Selected Poems (1968)
Figures of the Human (1964)
Say Pardon (1962)
The Gentle Weightlifter (1955)
Poems (Decker Press, 1948)

References

External links
Links to Ignatow's work
A tribute by Harvey Shapiro

On David Ignatow's Portrait, by Alan Cooper, in the Spring 2010 York College Library newsletter, page 7.
David Ignatow Papers MSS 2. Special Collections & Archives, UC San Diego Library.
Stuart A. Rose Manuscript, Archives, and Rare Book Library, Emory University: David Ignatow collection

1914 births
1997 deaths
Columbia University faculty
People from East Hampton (town), New York
Bollingen Prize recipients
20th-century American poets
York College, City University of New York faculty
PEN Oakland/Josephine Miles Literary Award winners